Stade Quillorama (formerly known as Stade Fernand-Bédard and Stade Stereo+) is a stadium in Trois-Rivières, Quebec, Canada. It is primarily used for baseball and is the home of the Trois-Rivières Aigles of the Frontier League. It was the home of the Trois-Rivières Saints of the Canadian Baseball League in 2003. The ballpark has a seating capacity of 4,000 and standing room which can accommodate an additional 500. It was opened in 1938, and it is also the home of Aigles Junior de Trois-Rivières of the Ligue de Baseball Junior Élite du Québec. The stadium name changed from Stade Fernand-Bédard to Stade Stereo+ on June 22, 2016. The change to Stade Quillorama was announced in December 2019.  Quillorama is a large bowling centre in Trois-Rivières.

References

External links
 Stadium history at Les Aigles de Trois-Rivières 

Sports venues in Trois-Rivières
Minor league baseball venues
Baseball venues in Quebec
1938 establishments in Quebec
Sports venues completed in 1938
Frontier League ballparks